DeAndre Thomas is an American college basketball player for Mount St. Mary's College He previously played for  Samford Bulldogs men's basketball.

References

External links 
Espn Basketball Profile
Samford Basketball Roster

1986 births
Living people
American expatriate basketball people in Canada
American expatriate basketball people in Thailand
American men's basketball players
Basketball players from Chicago
Chipola Indians men's basketball players
Halifax Rainmen players
Indiana Hoosiers men's basketball players
London Lightning players
Robert Morris Eagles men's basketball players
Windsor Express players
Centers (basketball)